BlackBerry 10 (BB10) is a discontinued proprietary mobile operating system for the BlackBerry line of smartphones, both developed by BlackBerry Limited (formerly known as Research In Motion). Released in January 2013, BlackBerry 10 is a complete rework from the company's previous BlackBerry OS software.

It is based on QNX, a Unix-like operating system that was originally developed by QNX Software Systems until the company was acquired by Research In Motion in 2010. BlackBerry 10 supports the application framework Qt (version 4.8) and in some later models features an Android runtime to run Android applications. Prior to version 10.3.1, BlackBerry 10 also supported the Adobe AIR runtime. The user interface uses a combination of gestures and touch-based interactions for navigation and control, making it possible to control a device without having to press any physical buttons, with the exception of the power button that switches the device on or off. It also supports hardware keyboards, including ones that support touch input.

On October 26, 2015, BlackBerry Limited announced that there were no plans to release new APIs and software development kits (SDKs) or adopt Qt version 5. Future updates, like versions 10.3.3 and 10.3.4, would focus on security and privacy enhancements only, effectively putting the operating system in maintenance mode. At the same time, the company introduced its first Android-based device, BlackBerry Priv. The BlackBerry Leap was the last smartphone released on the BB10 platform. After BlackBerry Limited ceased making smartphones in 2016, its successor BlackBerry Mobile by licensee TCL abandoned the platform and only developed devices based on Android, starting with the BlackBerry KeyOne. 

On December 15, 2017, BlackBerry Limited announced that there would be at least another two years of support for BlackBerry 10 and BlackBerry OS devices; in August 2019, however, BlackBerry stated in a press release that they would continue to support "critical infrastructure" for BlackBerry 10 beyond the end of the year. BlackBerry 10 became end-of-life effective January 4, 2022.

History 
The operating system was originally called BBX, but this was changed when BlackBerry was blocked from using the BBX trademark after legal action from BASIS International, who already used it for their software.

On November 12, 2012, CEO Thorsten Heins announced a 30 January 2013, launch of the BlackBerry 10 operating system version 10.0 and the first smartphones running it. The operating system, as well as two devices, the Z10 (a full touchscreen device), and the Q10 (a device equipped with a physical keyboard), were announced simultaneously around the world on January 30, 2013. The company also announced that the BlackBerry PlayBook tablet would receive an update to BlackBerry 10 later in 2013. Subsequently, BlackBerry stated when releasing their Q1 2014 financial results that the BlackBerry PlayBook would not be receiving an update to BlackBerry 10, citing that the hardware would not provide a good experience of BlackBerry 10 and were focusing on future devices. BlackBerry continued to support and develop the PlayBook with its separate Tablet OS.

On 14 May 2013 BlackBerry OS 10.1 was launched. This brought improvements to many features requested by users.

On 13 September 2013, in Asia, BlackBerry announced the launch of BlackBerry OS 10.2 and a new BlackBerry 10 device, the Z30, providing performance increases over the previous BlackBerry 10 devices.

On June 18, 2014, BlackBerry announced an official relationship with Amazon.com, which resulted in the 10.3 update bundling the Amazon Appstore.

On 15 December 2017, BlackBerry CEO John S. Chen announced that there would be at least two years of support for BlackBerry 10 and BlackBerry OS devices. At that time, the operating system was expected to be end of life at the end of 2019, with many built-in software packages having their support ended (such as Facebook, Dropbox, Evernote, LinkedIn, etc.).

BlackBerry Limited have announced that the operating system BlackBerry 7.1 OS and earlier, BlackBerry 10 software and BlackBerry PlayBook will become end of life effectively starting from January 4, 2022. After this period, some of the applications and services such as data, phone calls, SMS and 9-1-1 functionality built into it may not function properly.

Features

Controls 
The touchscreen is the predominant input method of BlackBerry 10, in addition to hardware keyboard for devices that have one. Users can use gestures and keyboard shortcuts to navigate around the system. For instance, a user can unlock the device or return to the home screen by swiping from the bottom to the top. Some gestures offer additional modes of interaction when they are used differently. For instance, the same gesture can be used to show unread notifications when the user swipes from the bottom edge to somewhat the middle and slightly to the right and also keep the finger on the touchscreen. Similarly, when the finger is moved from the bottom to the right in a curved motion, the user can enter BlackBerry Hub immediately. Devices with a hardware keyboard can use keyboard shortcuts to reach applications or perform specific functions more quickly.

Multitasking 
When a user returns to the home screen from within an application, the application is minimized into a so-called "Active Frame". An Active Frame is a miniaturized window of the application that keeps running in the background. A user can return to such an application by tapping on the Active Frame or close it by tapping on the X icon. Active Frames can have widget-like functionality and show small bits of information, similar to widgets on Android. For instance, the calendar application can show upcoming events and meetings. BlackBerry 10 limits the number of active applications and it varies per device.

BlackBerry Hub 
BlackBerry 10 collates emails, SMS/MMS, calls and notifications into the BlackBerry Hub. It shows all messages and notifications in a continuous list, sorted by date. The user can filter results by application or, in the case of email, also by inbox. The user can create, view or act upon messages or notifications directly from the Hub. For instance, when the user opens a Facebook message, the Hub will open a small part of the Facebook application and allow the user to perform the same actions as the Facebook application itself. Applications need to support the Hub specifically to use most of these features, which is only possible for applications written with the native SDK. Notifications from unsupported applications are collated in the generic notifications tab.

Miscellaneous 
Other notable features of BlackBerry 10 include:
 A virtual keyboard with support for predictive typing and several gestures.
 Voice control and BlackBerry Assistant (10.3.1 and later), a virtual assistant, with which the user can perform various tasks by voice input or typed queries.
 BlackBerry Balance, with which the user can separate personal from work data, if enabled by the device's enterprise server. The user can switch between two workspaces, each with their own applications, files and accounts.
 BlackBerry Link, with which the user can synchronize data between the device and a computer, update the device or make backups. It supports iTunes and Windows Media Player.

Applications

Preloaded 
BlackBerry 10 has a number of applications that help users perform various tasks and activities. These include a web browser, as well applications for notes, reminders, calculator, clock, music, media, weather and file management. Cloud services like Box and Dropbox are also integrated by default. In addition, BlackBerry's messaging service BlackBerry Messenger is included, which supports video chat, VoIP and screen sharing.

Third-party applications 
BlackBerry 10 can run applications that were written with its native SDK, Android applications compiled for API levels 10–18 (support varies per version) and applications written for Adobe AIR (only supported until version 10.3.1). BlackBerry 10 provides the distribution platform BlackBerry World. Since version 10.2.1, Android application packages can be installed directly, whereas on previous versions Android applications could only be installed through BlackBerry World or by sideloading, which required packaging such applications into a native package format (BAR). On version 10.3, BlackBerry Limited partnered with Amazon to bundle Amazon Appstore as another source of Android apps.

At release in January 2013, BlackBerry 10 had 70,000 third-party applications. At the 2013 BlackBerry Live conference, BlackBerry announced that they had more than 120,000 applications.

Some developers have offered applications to access the Google Play Store, although this is not sanctioned by BlackBerry or Google. Applications that depend on the Google Play Services framework may not run. Similarly, Android applications that require a newer API level than 18 cannot run on BlackBerry 10.

Devices

Released Devices 

BlackBerry 10 supports the following BlackBerry smartphones, all of which can run the latest version. The BlackBerry Leap is the last smartphone from BlackBerry to run the BlackBerry 10 operating system, as BlackBerry devices are now running Android instead.

Canceled devices 

 BlackBerry Colt, originally planned as the first QNX-powered BlackBerry smartphone
 BlackBerry Café, a 4.5" all-touch model intended for emerging markets
 BlackBerry Kopi, a 3.1" QWERTY model intended for emerging markets

Developer activities

Engagement strategy 
Building up to the launch, the company made substantial changes to how it had previously engaged developers, being substantially more active at courting developers, solving issues and being transparent about development updates. The company sent two teams to engage developers. The first, focused on acquiring premier applications from third parties. The second team focused on engaging the broader development community and building the platforms application count.

Prototype smartphones 
In May 2012, the company released a prototype touch screen smartphone to BlackBerry developers as part of the BlackBerry 10 Jam Conference in Orlando, Florida. The Dev Alpha A''' device, which resembled a small BlackBerry PlayBook, ran an early version of the operating system and was provided as a means for developers to develop and test their applications on a physical device.

In September 2012, a second developer prototype was released in September 2012, known as the Dev Alpha B. It includes a faster processor and a number of internal improvements.

A third developer device, the Dev Alpha C, was announced on November 29, 2012, and is the first developer prototype to demonstrate the physical keyboard capabilities of BlackBerry 10. Acquisition of a Dev Alpha C device is based around a point system, meaning that developers who have previously developed apps for BlackBerry, or have had the Dev Alpha A/B devices, will have a higher chance of receiving a device than a new BlackBerry developer. It was released at the BlackBerry Jam Europe 2013 event in February 2013.

 Portathons 
Pre-launch "Portathons" held by BlackBerry have received up to 19,000 applications submitted per weekend.

 Reception 
Reviews of BlackBerry 10 have been generally positive. David Pogue of The New York Times noted that the software was, "simple to master, elegantly designed and surprisingly complete. It offers features nobody else offers, some tailored to the corporate world that raised BlackBerry aloft in its glory days." Walt Mossberg of The Wall Street Journal'' referred to the operating system as "logical and generally easy to use". Mossberg praised the virtual keyboard, camera software, and messaging hub; but criticized its application ecosystem, cloud capabilities and the immaturity of some features. Gizmodo's Kyle Wagner states that BlackBerry 10's home screen "gives BB10 the single best implementation of multitasking of any mobile OS right now". Wagner goes on to say that the Hub "works out to function a bit more like a junk drawer". He also reports what he refers to as the "Tragic Flaw": "Unlike every other major OS right now, BlackBerry does not feel fully integrated.". Wagner's review was based on the BB 10.0 and since the initial reviews of BB10 the OS has been updated several times and for many the issues have been addressed.

In comparison to that, at launch, CrackBerry.com views the new features more positively and takes into account the fact that the OS is brand new. It says that the BlackBerry Hub "is a polished solution to efficiently managing the influx of messages we have coming at us...". It goes on to mention minor discrepancies and finally pointing out that many of the problems are getting fixed in future updates (some now released, e.g. battery life improvements, call ringtone disabled in bedside mode). It criticizes the limited customization options compared to BlackBerry OS (Alert tone volumes, alert light colour). Regarding the apps in BlackBerry World "really impressed by the quality of apps BlackBerry World has to offer", it notes that the application ecosystem is not as large as Android and iOS because of its age (brand new) and finishes with "doubtlessly many more will come around once they see the Z10 getting traction in the wild." Its general summary of BlackBerry 10 (with thought for its predecessor) "is that BlackBerry 10 really is the best of the old and the best of the new assembled seamlessly into an elegant, practical, and integrated package."

As of Q2 2013, the new BlackBerry 10 platform had almost the same number of developers using the platform as the legacy BlackBerry 5/6/7 had just before the release of BlackBerry 10. Within a few months from its launch, the BlackBerry 10 platform was used by approximately 15% of mobile developers.

BlackBerry 10 added a compatibility layer for Android software, which allowed developers to repackage their Android apps for distribution on BlackBerry World. This advertised feature has received a poor reception as the Android apps "performed abysmally on the phone. Sluggish, ugly, and disconnected from the core OS. In fact, because these apps are being run in a software emulation of Android — Gingerbread no less (that's version 2.3) — they bear little to no relationship to the rest of the operating system". Later versions added the ability for users to manually install Android app packages. Beginning with the BlackBerry Passport, Amazon Appstore was bundled with BlackBerry 10 to provide an additional source of third-party Android software. BlackBerry CEO John S. Chen hoped that Amazon's own smartphone, the Fire Phone, would bolster the adoption of the Amazon store and attract more major developers to it, and in turn, BlackBerry's ecosystem. The Fire Phone was a commercial failure, however, which led to BlackBerry's decision to develop an Android phone of its own, resulting in the BlackBerry Priv.

Version history

BlackBerry BBX 

During the BlackBerry DevCon Americas Conference in San Francisco held from October 18–20, 2011 RIM announced the future platform for devices as "BlackBerry BBX", a development fork of the QNX Neutrino RTOS version 6.5.0 platform.  On May 1, 2012 it was announced at BlackBerry World 2012 held in Orlando that it would be instead be called BlackBerry 10.

BlackBerry 10.0

BlackBerry 10.1

BlackBerry 10.2

BlackBerry 10.3

See also 
 Comparison of mobile operating systems
 Mobile computing
 Index of articles related to BlackBerry OS
 List of BlackBerry 10 devices

References

External links 

 

ARM operating systems
BlackBerry
BlackBerry development software
Embedded operating systems
Lightweight Unix-like systems
Microkernel-based operating systems
Mobile operating systems
Mobile software
Real-time operating systems
Software that uses Qt
Smartphone operating systems